Realgar, also known as "ruby sulphur" or "ruby of arsenic", is an arsenic sulfide mineral with the chemical formula α-. It is a soft, sectile mineral occurring in monoclinic crystals, or in granular, compact, or powdery form, often in association with the related mineral, orpiment. It is orange-red in color, melts at 320 °C, and burns with a bluish flame releasing fumes of arsenic and sulfur. Realgar is soft with a Mohs hardness of 1.5 to 2 and has a specific gravity of 3.5. Its streak is orange colored. It is trimorphous with pararealgar and bonazziite.
Its name comes from the Arabic rahj al-ġār ("powder of the mine"), via Medieval Latin, and its earliest record in English is in the 1390s.

Uses
Realgar is a minor ore of arsenic extracted in China, Peru, and the Philippines.

Historical uses
Realgar was used by firework manufacturers to create the color white in fireworks prior to the availability of powdered metals such as aluminium, magnesium and titanium. It is still used in combination with potassium chlorate to make a contact explosive known as "red explosive" for some types of torpedoes and other novelty exploding fireworks branded as 'cracker balls', as well in the cores of some types of crackling stars.

Realgar is toxic. It was sometimes used to kill weeds, insects, and rodents, even though more effective arsenic-based anti-pest agents are available such as cacodylic acid, an organoarsenic compound used as herbicide and also to kill ants and mice.

Realgar was commonly used in leather manufacturing to remove hair from animal pelts. Because it is a known carcinogen and an arsenic poison, and because substitutes are available, it is rarely used today for this purpose.

The ancient Greeks, who called realgar , understood that it was poisonous. From this, realgar has also historically been known in English as sandarac.

Realgar was also used by Ancient Greek apothecaries to make a medicine known as "bull's blood". The Greek physician Nicander described a death by "bull's blood", which matches the known effects of arsenic poisoning. Bull's blood is the poison that is said to have been used by Themistocles and Midas for suicide.

Realgar was, along with orpiment, traded in the Roman Empire and was used as a red paint pigment. Early occurrences of realgar as a red paint pigment are known for works of art from China, India, Central Asia, and Egypt. It was used in European fine-art painting during the Renaissance era, a use which died out by the 18th century. It was also used as medicine. Other traditional uses include manufacturing lead shot, printing, and dyeing calico cloth. It was used to poison rats in medieval Spain and in 16th century England.

Occurrence 
Realgar most commonly occurs as a low-temperature hydrothermal vein mineral associated with other arsenic and antimony minerals. It also occurs as volcanic sublimations and in hot spring deposits. It occurs in association with orpiment, arsenolite, calcite and barite.

It is found with lead, silver and gold ores in Hungary, Bohemia and Saxony. In the US it occurs notably in Mercur, Utah; Manhattan, Nevada; and in the geyser deposits of Yellowstone National Park.

After a long period of exposure to light, realgar changes form to a yellow powder known as pararealgar (β-). It was once thought that this powder was the yellow sulfide orpiment, but is a distinct chemical compound.

Gallery

See also

 Classification of minerals
 List of inorganic pigments
 List of minerals

References

Further reading
 The Merck Index: An Encyclopedia of Chemicals, Drugs, and Biologicals. 11th Edition. Ed. Susan Budavari. Merck & Co., Inc., N.J., U.S.A. 1989.
 William Mesny. Mesny’s Chinese Miscellany. A Text Book of Notes on China and the Chinese. Shanghai. Vol. III, (1899), p. 251; Vol. IV, (1905), pp. 425–426.
 American Mineralogist Vol 80, pp 400–403, 1995 
 American Mineralogist Vol 20, pp 1266–1274, 1992

External links

 Mindat.org: Pararealgar

Arsenic minerals
Sulfide minerals
Alchemical substances
Monoclinic minerals
Minerals in space group 14
Inorganic pigments